The 1998 Vuelta a Castilla y León was the 13th edition of the Vuelta a Castilla y León cycle race and was held on 1 June to 4 June 1998. The race started in Palencia and finished in Valladolid. The race was won by Aitor Garmendia.

General classification

References

Vuelta a Castilla y León
Vuelta a Castilla y León by year
1998 in Spanish sport